Zeljko Radovic (born April 6, 1974 in Vienna) is an Austrian retired football player.

International career
Radovic is former member of the Austria national football team and earned his only cap in 2000 in the qualification to the FIFA World Cup 2002.

Coaching career
Radovic ended his career in 2011. From 2011 to March 2019 he worked as a youth coach at SK Rapid Vienna. In March 2019 he took over the Rapid's reserve team, which played in the Regionalliga Ost. He led the team to promotion to the 2nd division in 2020. Shortly before the start of the 2020/21 season, he terminated his contract with Rapid in September 2020.

References

1974 births
Living people
Austrian footballers
Austrian expatriate footballers
Austria international footballers
First Vienna FC players
Grazer AK players
SK Rapid Wien players
SV Ried players
Arminia Bielefeld players
Kapfenberger SV players
Austrian Football Bundesliga players
Association football forwards
Austrian expatriate sportspeople in Germany
Expatriate footballers in Germany
Austrian football managers